There are a small number of railways in New Zealand, primarily used to carry passengers for amusement purposes. They are of three different gauges: 101⁄2, 15 and 24 inch.

Note that the national railway network uses  Cape gauge; see Rail transport in New Zealand.

Narrow gauge railways in New Zealand